Dawe may refer to:

Dawe (surname)
Dawé, Benin
DAWE (Department of Agriculture, Water and the Environment), Australian government department

See also
Daw (disambiguation)
Daou (disambiguation)
Dawes (disambiguation)
Dawe Kachen, Ethiopia
Dawe Serara, Ethiopia